Edward Bardgett (born 20 May 1955) is a Bermudian sailor. He competed in the Tornado event at the 1988 Summer Olympics.

References

External links
 

1955 births
Living people
Bermudian male sailors (sport)
Olympic sailors of Bermuda
Sailors at the 1988 Summer Olympics – Tornado
Place of birth missing (living people)